Pelargonium laxum is a species of South African erect, branched-stem succulent plant that grows to 30 cm in height.

The name was listed as unresolved by The Plant List .

References

 Gen. Hist. 1: 730 1831.
 JSTOR entry
 Operation Wildflower entry

laxum